Botrydium is a genus of thalloid algae.  Specimens can reach around 2 mm in size and produce tetraspores.

Species
Some currently recognised species:
 Botrydium becherianum
 Botrydium corniforme
 Botrydium cystosum
 Botrydium divisum
 Botrydium granulatum
 Botrydium intermedium
 Botrydium milleri
 Botrydium pachydermum
 Botrydium stoloniferum
 Botrydium tuberosum
 Botrydium wallrothii

References

Heterokont genera
Xanthophyceae
Taxa named by Karl Friedrich Wilhelm Wallroth